St. James Cathedral is a parish church and the seat of the Bishop of the Catholic Diocese of Orlando, John Noonan. The cathedral's patron saint is James, son of Zebedee, one of the Twelve Apostles of Jesus, and traditionally considered the first apostle to be martyred. The scallop shell has long been the symbol associated with St. James, and the cathedral uses it as its primary symbol. The parish operates St. James Cathedral School on nearby Robinson Street which offers classes from pre-school through eighth grade.

History

St. James Parish traces its roots to May 20, 1881, when Bishop John Moore of the Diocese of St. Augustine, which then covered the entire state of Florida, purchased land to establish the first Catholic Church in the Orlando area. The first permanent pastor, Father Felix P. Swembergh arrived in 1885 to organize the congregation from the area's residents. Between 1880 and 1885, the population of Orlando increased from 200 to over 4,000 people.

The cornerstone for the first church building was laid January 23, 1887 and it was completed in June 1891.

The parish established a school in 1928. The two-story Mediterranean Revival school building, which was completed the same year, is a contributing property in the Lake Eola Heights Historic District. It features a bell tower, an ornate entrance, and embellished friezes.

The present church building was begun in late 1950, and completed on January 20, 1952. When the Diocese of Orlando was split from the Diocese of St. Augustine on June 18, 1968, St. Charles Borromeo Church was selected as the cathedral. It was significantly damaged in a fire on October 1, 1976. The cathedral was moved to St. James Church the following year. Bishop Thomas Grady dedicated St. James as the diocesan cathedral on November 20, 1977. A renovation of the facility took place from 1979 to 1985. During this time the parish life center and Blessed Sacrament Chapel were built, and the cathedral church was renovated.

The cathedral underwent the most recent of several renovations beginning in May 2009. Work included restoration of stonework on the facade that was covered during the previous renovation, interior decoration, lighting, and installation of windows to comply with current hurricane-codes. A marble altar, tabernacle throne and baptismal font were created in Carrara, Italy to complement new pews. The cathedral organ, Wicks Organ Company Opus 6028, was restored and enlarged by Wicks along with a smaller organ in the cathedral chapel.

See also
List of Catholic cathedrals in the United States
List of cathedrals in Florida

Notes

External links

St. James Cathedral website
Diocese of Orlando website
St. James Cathedral School website

Churches in Orlando, Florida
James Orlando
Religious organizations established in 1885
Roman Catholic churches completed in 1952
Roman Catholic Diocese of Orlando
Romanesque Revival church buildings in Florida
1885 establishments in Florida
20th-century Roman Catholic church buildings in the United States